Associazione Sportiva Junior Pallacanestro Casale Monferrato, commonly known as Junior Casale and currently for sponsorship reasons as Novipiù Casale Monferrato is an Italian professional basketball team based in Casale Monferrato, Piedmont. It plays in the Italian second division Serie A2.

The team plays its home games in the PalaFerraris, which has a capacity of 3,508 people.

History
Associazione Sportiva Junior Libertas Pallacanestro was founded in 1956 and took part in the regional Prima Divisione that same season.
It reached the second division in less than ten years.
Back in the fourth division Serie B2 in 2000–01, the club earned a promotion to the Serie B d'Eccellenza that season.
Winning that league's cup in 2005, Junior was promoted to the second division LegaDue as well after beating Forlì in the playoff finals on 2 June 2005.
The side would reach the promotion playoffs five times in the next six seasons, with two semifinal exits their best results until 2010-11 where they won the regular season before downing Reyer Venezia in the final to move up to the first division Serie A.
The club would be relegated after one season, finishing last in 2011–12.

Honors
 Trofeo Lombardia
 Winners (1): 2011

Notable players 

  Ronald Slay 1 season: '05-'06
  Tiras Wade 1 season: '05-'06
  Alex Bougaieff 1 season: '05-'06
  Michael Johnson 1 season: '05-'06
  Cameron Bennerman 1 season: '06-'07
  Mindaugas Katelynas 1 season: '06-'07
  Troy Bell 1 season: '07-'08
  Zabian Dowdell 1 season: '08-'09
  Otis George 2 seasons: '06-'08
  Matteo Formenti 7 seasons: '02-'09
  Bernd Volcic 1 season: '07-'08
  Ricky Hickman 1 season: '10-'11
  Povilas Butkevičius 2 season: '12-'13, '14-'15

Head coaches 
  Marco Crespi 6 seasons: '06-'12

Sponsorship names
Throughout the years, due to sponsorship deals, it has been also known as:
Krumiri Casale Monferrato (2003)
Bistefani Casale Monferrato (2003-2004) 
Curtiriso Casale Monferrato (2005-2006)
Junior Casale Monferrato (2006-2007)
Fastweb Junior Casale (2007-2011)
Novipiù Casale Monferrato (2011–present)

References

External links 
Lega Nazionale Pallacanestro profile  Retrieved 25 August 2015
Serie A historical results  Retrieved 25 August 2015
Eurobasket.com profile Retrieved 25 August 2015

1956 establishments in Italy
Basketball teams established in 1956
Basketball teams in Piedmont
Sport in Casale Monferrato